The Secret Partner is a 1961 British thriller film directed by Basil Dearden and starring Stewart Granger, Haya Harareet and Bernard Lee. The screenplay concerns a shipping executive officer who is blackmailed by an evil dentist.

Plot 
John Brent (Stewart Granger) is an executive, working under Charles Standish (Hugh Burden) at the London head office of a shipping company. His marriage is in trouble because he is always short of money; his wife Nicole (Haya Harareet), certain he is spending it on another woman, leaves him and takes up with Clive Lang (John Lee), a decorator they have hired.

What Brent's employer does not know is that his real name is John Wilson and he was once imprisoned for embezzlement. When he chose a dentist after being released, it happened to be the same man who did dental work at the prison, Ralph Beldon (Norman Bird). Brent is not cheating on Nicole, but Beldon is blackmailing him by threatening to reveal his true identity to the company.

One day a stranger, his face masked and his voice disguised by an insert in his mouth, arrives at Beldon's home. He knows about the blackmail and demands Beldon take further advantage of Brent. Beldon will be mailed a package of sodium pentothal. At Brent's next dental appointment, he is to inject Brent with this truth serum and demand the combination to Standish's safe at the office. While Brent is incapacitated, he must also make impressions of Brent's keys, both home and office. Beldon is promised £15,000 to be paid later.

The plan is carried out, and the safe is robbed on a day when it happens to contain more money than usual – £100,000 – because of the scheduling of the ships.

Detective Superintendent Hanbury (Bernard Lee) and Inspector Henderson (Lee Montague) investigate the case. There is no sign of a break-in; Brent and Standish have the only keys and are the only ones entrusted with the combination. Brent has just left the country on vacation and his keys are at the office. Traces of clay on them indicate that impressions were made.

Henderson jumps to the conclusion that Brent is guilty and provided the impressions to the actual thief; Hanbury, who is about to retire and wants to leave things neat and tidy, is less certain and insists on a proper investigation. They question Standish, Nicole, Lang, and others, and have Brent brought back to England for questioning. Standish had a motive to hurt Brent: he had learned that Brent was likely to be promoted to replace him.

But at Brent's apartment, the detectives find evidence of keys being copied. Brent manages to distract them and flee. He then tries to investigate on his own, and also to mislead the police, until he finally realizes that he might have been drugged by Beldon.

He calls Hanbury to Beldon's place and goes there with a gun, threatening Beldon at gunpoint until the man confesses to all his crimes. Brent then hands the unloaded gun to Hanbury.

The viewer learns the truth when Brent returns home and demonstrates to Nicole the disguise he used on Beldon. Brent is the criminal and always intended to frame himself and then blame Beldon. In this way he would get rid of the blackmailer and he and Nicole would have £85,000 to share.

However, she is not interested. She feels he took advantage of her by faking the breakup of their marriage and saddling her with Lang's attentions, and now she has fallen in love with another man and wants to leave him for real.

Heartbroken, Brent returns the money anonymously. Hanbury calls him in: he has guessed Brent's tricks, including the "pentothal" that was actually some harmless liquid, but to Henderson's surprise, he does not now feel it would be worthwhile prosecuting Brent.

Henderson wishes Hanbury a happy retirement, and Brent walks away, now alone in the world.

Cast
 Stewart Granger as John Brent, aka John Wilson 
 Haya Harareet as Nicole 'Nikki' Brent 
 Bernard Lee as Detective Superintendent Frank Hanbury 
 Hugh Burden as Charles Standish 
 Lee Montague as Detective Inspector Tom Henderson 
 Melissa Stribling as Helen Standish 
 Conrad Phillips as Dr. Alan Richford 
 John Lee as Clive Lang 
 Norman Bird as Ralph Beldon 
 Peter Illing as Strakarios 
 Basil Dignam as Lyle 
 William Fox as Brinton
 Sidney Vivian as Dock Forman
 Willoughby Goddard as Hotel Keeper 
 Peter Welch as P.C. McLaren
 Dorothy Gordon as Miss Kerrigan, Dentist's Receptionist

Production
Filming started on 1 September 1960. It was shot at the MGM-British Studios at Elstree and on location at a variety of settings across London, including Tower Bridge, the Royal Docks, Greenwich and South Kensington. The sets were designed by art director Elliot Scott.

The film was Haya Harareet's next film after Ben Hur.

Critical reception
In AllMovie, Eleanor Mannikka called the film a "routine mystery story"; while in the Radio Times, Allen Eyles noted "an implausible but ingenious British thriller...flashily directed by Basil Dearden...It remains watchable thanks to some skilful characterisation and the strong performances of Stewart Granger as the executive, Norman Bird as the dentist, and Bernard Lee as the dogged, chain-smoking policeman looking forward to retirement."

References

External links
 
 The Secret Partner at Letterbox DVD
 
 
 Review at Cinema Retro

1961 films
1960s thriller drama films
Films directed by Basil Dearden
British thriller drama films
Metro-Goldwyn-Mayer films
Films set in London
Films shot in London
1961 drama films
Films shot at MGM-British Studios
1960s English-language films
1960s British films